The Komsomol of Ukraine, officially the Leninist Communist League of Youth of Ukraine, was a youth organization in the Ukrainian Soviet Socialist Republic under the Communist Party of Ukraine, a component part of the All-Union Lenin's Communist League of Youth (Komsomol). It was first established in 1919 as the youth wing of the Communist Party (Bolsheviks) of Ukraine and later revived in 1997 as the youth wing of the modern Communist Party of Ukraine; that party was banned in 2015.

History 
Predecessors of Komsomol in Ukraine were youth organizations created in Kyiv, Kharkiv, Poltava, Odesa, Mykolaiv, and some other cities after the February Revolution and under political agitation from Bolsheviks professed a Marxist ideology calling themselves "socialist leagues of working youth". Bolsheviks actively used these organizations first to carry out underground revolutionary activities and later to seize power and suppression of resistance, carry out armed actions, others. For such purpose at this organizations were created "battle retinues" (basic formations of Bolshevik Military Organizations), many members of which were directed to detachments of the Red Guards.

Soon after the Bolshevik coup-d'état in Petrograd, also known as the "Great October Revolution", in order to increase ideological and organizational influence on the leagues and youth in general in all cities of the former Imperial Russia, Bolshevik started the process of establishing a united centralized communist league of youth. The creation of such youth organization was started by the Central Committee of the Russian Communist Party (Bolsheviks). At first there was created the Russian Communist League of Youth (RKSM, see Komsomol). In October of 1918 at the First Congress of RKSM were adopted the program and statute of the league where it was proclaimed its basic tasks to spread ideology of communism, revolutionary upbringing of youth, active participation in development of the Soviet State. The organizational principle in development of Komsomol was a "democratic centralism" that as in the Bolshevik party ensured full control over members of organization on the part of its leaders. Locally the activities of Komsomol cells were directed and controlled by local Communist Party cells. At the First Congress of RKSM, there was present only one delegate from Ukraine. This did not prevent the congress from declaring that "the moment is near when revolutionary Ukrainian youth will join the united family of working youth of Russia".

During the second phase of the Soviet-Ukrainian War in 1919, the leaders of the newly formed Communist Party (Bolsheviks) of Ukraine led the process of creating all-Ukrainian communist league of youth, the Communist League of Working Youth of Ukraine (KSRMU). At the First Congress of KSRMU (June–July, 1919) it was declared that the league shares the program and tactics of the Communist Party (Bolsheviks) of Ukraine, operates under its leadership. It was claimed: a) Communist League of Working Youth of Ukraine is a part of RKSM; b) the Central Committee of KSRMU operates as a regional branch of RKSM. According with the KSRMU statute, the organization was accepting only "workers' youth" (that limitation was implemented because as it was explained in the document no to "dilute" the league with persons who do not have the "proletarian class training"). Along with that since the RCP(b) leadership had a goal to create a mass participated communist league of youth, soon the entry to RKSM and its branch KSRMU was permitted also of peasant origin as well as student youth. In August 1919 both CC RCP(b) and CC RKSM sent out a mutual directive that Komsomol recognizes the RCP(b) program and tactics and is an autonomous organization that operates "under control of the Center and local party cells". To the Komsomol may have been enrolled young people from age of 14, at the same time it was mandatory to join for all RCP(b) members under age of 20. The Second Congress of RKSM (October 1919) declared that all "communist activities among youth are carried out by the RKSM. There should not be any other special national communist leagues of youth".

The Komsomol in Ukraine was established on June 26, 1919 as the Communist League of Working Youth of Ukraine. In the Soviet Union such organization existed in 1919–1991. It was dissolved after the Communist Party of Ukraine was prohibited in Ukraine. It was revived in 1997. The original publishing newspaper was Molod Ukrayiny (1925–1991).

In 2011, with the support from the Communist Party of Ukraine and the Ministry of Education and Science, Komsomol initiated a process on revival of the Pioneer Organization of Ukraine. The base of the organization will be a reformed ideology of Children Communist. It currently a member of the Left Opposition, as is its mother party.

Leaders of Komsomol

See also
 Komsomol

References

External links
Official website
Vasyliev, V. The Lenin's Communist League of Youth of Ukraine (ЛЕНІНСЬКА КОМУНІСТИЧНА СПІЛКА МОЛОДІ УКРАЇНИ). Encyclopedia of History of Ukraine. 2009
Resolution of the Supreme Council of Ukraine "About the 85th Anniversary of Komsomol of Ukraine and enforcing the role of youth public organization in development of relationship with the youth
Official website of the Pioneer Organization of Ukraine
Interview of the last leader of Komsomol to the weekly "Events and people". by Irina Golotyuk in 2008

Communist Party of Ukraine
Communist Party of Ukraine (Soviet Union)
Komsomol
Youth wings of communist parties
Recipients of the Order of Lenin
Recipients of the Order of the Red Banner
Youth organizations established in 1919
1919 establishments in Russia